Chattooga County is a county located in the northwestern part of the U.S. state of Georgia. As of the 2020 census, the population was 24,965. The county seat is Summerville. The county was created on December 28, 1838.

Chattooga County comprises the Summerville, GA Micropolitan Statistical Area, which is included in the Rome-Summerville Combined Statistical Area.

Summerville is the site of the Chattooga County Courthouse. The county is home to several properties listed on the National Register of Historic Places.

History
Chattooga County is named for the Chattooga River, which flows through it. It was originally settled by the "mound builder" culture. A few small mounds can be found throughout the Alpine and Menlo areas. Sometime in the pre-European settlement era, the county was settled by at first the Creek Native Americans and later the Cherokee Native Americans. The principal Cherokee towns in Chattooga were Rivertown (Trion) and Broomtown in Shinbone valley. With the onset of European settlers and after gold was discovered in northern Georgia, the federal government forcibly removed the Cherokees to Oklahoma from Chattooga County in the early 1830s in what has become known as "the Trail of Tears." In this removal, thousands of Native Americans died from sickness, hunger and abuse. The land was then divided amongst white settlers in the Cherokee Land Lottery of 1832. The Lottery transformed Chattooga into a thriving agricultural area in the antebellum South with farms of varying size dotting the fertile landscape of the Chattooga Valley.

The coming of the American Civil War saw Chattoogans polarized into pro and anti-union camps. Confederate armies received five regiments from Chattooga. Several engagements were fought in the county prior to the battle of Chickamauga. General Nathan Bedford Forrest fought an engagement near Alpine with Federal cavalry resulting in the Federals being thrown back to the Chattanooga area. The largest single engagement in Chattooga was the "Battle of Trion Factory," fought on Sept. 15th, 1863 on present day First Street near the site of the East Trion Church of God. Confederate Infantry forces under the command of General Benjamin Hardin Helm and cavalry under the command of Gen. Joseph Wheeler defeated Union forces in a running battle that started somewhere near Summerville and ended in Trion. The front section of the Old Trion Cemetery on First Street contains the remains of fifty-five Union soldiers and seven Confederates killed in this action, but the graves are unmarked.

The 1860 county census shows population of 7,165, 28.7 percent of whom were enslaved.

In September 2009, the Chattooga County Camp 507, Sons of Confederate Veterans in conjunction with the Missionary Ridge Camp 63 Sons of Union Veterans, and several local groups erected a memorial monument to remember the "First Battle of Trion Factory" and the soldiers who are buried in unmarked graves at Trion.

In an interesting side note, Confederate General Helm was a brother-in-law to Mary Lincoln and was killed five days after the Battle of Trion Factory on Sept. 19th at the Battle of Chickamauga in Walker County, GA

The coming of Sherman
After the fall of Atlanta, Confederate General John Bell Hood led his Army of Tennessee from the Atlanta battleground to the north and west, in an attempt to lead General William Tecumseh Sherman's Army of the Cumberland away from Atlanta and out of Georgia. Sherman left a detachment in Atlanta while he took the remainder of his army in pursuit of Hood and the Confederates. Hood's army passed through Chattooga County in September 1864 en route to Gaylesville, Alabama.

General Sherman reportedly stated, upon first seeing the Chattooga Valley from atop Taylors Ridge, that it "is a good fertile valley suitable for agriculture." Upon reaching Summerville, Sherman was informed of a Confederate training camp several miles up the river from town. He proceeded north about two miles and "fired a few shots at the retreating rear guard" of the Confederate force. Reportedly, every road leading out of Chattooga to the west was filled with retreating Confederate soldiers. Sherman telegraphed General Henry Halleck and President Abraham Lincoln from Summerville, to outline his plan for the "March to the Sea," making Chattooga County the birthplace of his march.

Government
Chattooga County is a Republican stronghold in Northwest Georgia. The NW GA region has followed the state, particularly the suburbs of Atlanta, in a dramatic political shift to the right. While most counties in Northwest Georgia vote heavily Republican on the local, state, and national levels, Chattooga is still a Democratic County. The county elected a Republican commissioner in 2016. The county has supported Republicans for national office, but by much closer margins than most areas of the region.

The county is in Georgia's 11th state house district. Former Georgia State Patrolman Eddie Lumsden (R-Armuchee) represents the district, which includes all of Chattooga and parts of Floyd County, in the State House of Representatives . The county is represented by Chickamauga Republican Jeff Mullis in the State Senate.

Chattooga County is served by a vast array of public offices. The county is one of the few in the State of Georgia that still operates under one county commissioner. Blake Elsberry, a local businessman, defeated incumbent Commissioner Jason Winters in the Primary election in 2020. Elsberry‘s office is on Commerce Street in downtown Summerville, the county's seat.

Sheriff Ralph Kellett served the community as sheriff for almost two decades before losing the Democratic Primary election to John Everett in 2008. Kellett died in 2011. Sheriff Everett kept the seat in Democratic hands in the General Election. In 2012, Everett faced a federal lawsuit regarding questionable practices as sheriff, and ended up losing in the 2012 primary, the only incumbent to do so. Democrat Mark Schrader won the 2012 general election and has been regarded as one of the most successful sheriffs in county history. Schrader's office is located on West Washington Street beside the county courthouse.

Other elected officers include Tax Commissioner Joy Cooper Hampton, Kim Windle James, the first woman to serve as Clerk of Superior and State Courts, Earle Rainwater as Coroner, and Jon Payne as Probate Judge and Election Superintendent.  Buddy Hill serves as Solicitor General and Jon Dennis is the State Court Judge. Judge Kristina Cook-Connelly, daughter of Attorney Bobby Lee Cook, is judge on the Lookout Mountain Judicial Circuit.

The county's school board, under Chattooga County School Superintendent Jimmy Lenderman, Leroy Massey Elementary, Menlo School, Lyerly School, Summerville Middle, and Chattooga High School. Chattooga High School is a "Class AA" school according to the Georgia High School Association. The board also oversees one alternative school. The members of the school board are Larry Weesner, Alma Lewis, John Turner, Eddie Massey, and John Agnew, republican D5[4]. The other school system in Chattooga's County is the Trion City School System. The system, constantly named one of the best public schools in the State of Georgia, is served by Superintendent Dr. H. Phillip Williams. The school board is chaired by Connie Witt. The system has one elementary, one middle, and one high school. The school is on one campus and is a "Class A" school according to the Georgia High School Association. The school was recently named a Georgia School of Excellence.

Geography

The eastern third of Chattooga County is located in the Oostanaula River sub-basin of the ACT River Basin (Coosa-Tallapoosa River Basin), while the western two-thirds of the county is located in the Upper Coosa River sub-basin of the same ACT River Basin.

Major highways
  U.S. Route 27
  State Route 1
  State Route 48
  State Route 100
  State Route 114
  State Route 157
  State Route 337

Adjacent counties
 Walker County - north
 Cherokee County, Alabama - west (CST)
 DeKalb County, Alabama - west (CST)

National protected area
 Chattahoochee National Forest (part)

Demographics

2000 census
As of the census of 2010, there were 26,015 people, 9,548 households, and 6,837 families residing in the county.  The population density was 83 people per square mile (32/km2).  There were 10,977 housing units at an average density of 35 per square mile (13.5/km2).  The racial makeup of the county was 83.91% White, 11.14% Black or African American, 0.08% Native American, 0.42% Asian, 0.02% Pacific Islander, 2.58% from other races, and 1.59% from two or more races.  4.00% of the population were Hispanic or Latino of any race.

There were 9,577 households, out of which 33% had children under the age of 18 living with them, 47% were married couples living together, 5% had a female householder with no husband present, and 31% were non-families. 25.20% of all households were made up of individuals, and 29% had one or more persons living there who was 65 years of age or older.  The average household size was 2.6 and the average family size was 2.94.

In the county, the population was spread out, with 22.90% under the age of 18, 10.00% from 18 to 24, 30.00% from 25 to 44, 22.80% from 45 to 64, and 14.30% who were 65 years of age or older.  The median age was 36 years. For every 100 females there were 106.60 males.  For every 100 females age 18 and over, there were 106.60 males.

The median income for a household in the county was $30,664, and the median income for a family was $36,230. Males had a median income of $26,505 versus $21,014 for females. The per capita income for the county was $14,508.  About 11.30% of families and 14.30% of the population were below the poverty line, including 17.40% of those under age 18 and 14.90% of those age 65 or over.

2010 census
As of the 2010 United States Census, there were 26,015 people, 9,548 households, and 6,665 families residing in the county. The racial makeup of the county was 83.9% white, 11.1% black or African American, 0.4% Asian, 0.3% American Indian, 0.1% Pacific islander, 2.6% from other races, and 1.6% from two or more races. Those of Hispanic or Latino origin made up 4.0% of the population. In terms of ancestry, 41.1% were American, 8.5% were Irish, 6.5% were German, and 5.9% were English.

Of the 9,548 households, 33.6% had children under the age of 18 living with them, 50.4% were married couples living together, 14.0% had a female householder with no husband present, 30.2% were non-families, and 26.6% of all households were made up of individuals. The average household size was 2.52 and the average family size was 3.02. The median age was 39.3 years.

The median income for a household in the county was $32,419 and the median income for a family was $39,037. Males had a median income of $32,099 versus $25,475 for females. The per capita income for the county was $15,158. About 14.6% of families and 19.2% of the population were below the poverty line, including 24.8% of those under age 18 and 16.1% of those age 65 or over.

2020 census

As of the 2020 United States census, there were 24,965 people, 9,260 households, and 5,853 families residing in the county.

Education

Recreation
 Sloppy Floyd Lake Park
 Chattahoochee–Oconee National Forest
 Chattooga River

Cities and communities

Incorporated cities

 Summerville
 Trion
 Lyerly
 Menlo

Unincorporated communities

 Alpine
 Armuchee
 Berryton
 Chattoogaville
 Cloudland
 Farmersville
 Subligna
 Gore
 Holland
 Pennville
 Silver Hill
 Teloga

Politics

Notable people
 Howard Finster, Christian folk artist
 Rick Camp, former baseball pitcher for the Atlanta Braves
 Bobby Lee Cook, notable defense attorney
 Edna Cain Daniel, journalist and publisher
 Barbara Massey Reece, former member of the Georgia House of Representatives
 Senorise Perry, NFL football player
 Brody Malone, U.S. Olympic Gymnast

See also

 National Register of Historic Places listings in Chattooga County, Georgia
 Northwest Georgia Joint Development Authority
List of counties in Georgia

References

External links

 Official: Chattooga County Website
 Historical and ancestral information for Chattooga County
 News and information from Chattooga County
 Chattooga County historical marker

 
1838 establishments in Georgia (U.S. state)
Populated places established in 1838
Georgia (U.S. state) counties
Georgia placenames of Native American origin
Northwest Georgia (U.S.)
Counties of Appalachia